Kızılören is a village in the Araç District of Kastamonu Province in Turkey. Its population is 62 (2021).

References

Villages in Araç District